The Lamanites are one of the four ancient peoples (along with the Jaredites, the Mulekites, and the Nephites) described as having settled in the ancient Americas in the Book of Mormon, a sacred text of the Latter Day Saint movement. The Lamanites also play a role in the prophecies and revelations of the Doctrine and Covenants, another sacred text in the Latter Day Saint movement.

In the Book of Mormon’s narrative, the Lamanites began as wicked rivals to the more righteous Nephites, but when the Nephite civilization became decadent, it lost divine favor and was destroyed by the Lamanites. Latter Day Saints have historically associated Lamanites with present-day Native American cultures.

Book of Mormon narrative

According to the Book of Mormon, the family of Lehi, described as a wealthy Hebrew prophet; the family of Ishmael; and Zoram traveled from the Middle East to the Americas by boat in around 600 BC. Some time after the death of Lehi in the Americas, Nephi, a son of Lehi, was concerned that his brothers, Laman and Lemuel, were plotting to kill him and so he, his family, and his followers left and went into the wilderness. The followers of Nephi called themselves "Nephites" and referred to others as "Lamanites," after Laman, Nephi's eldest brother.

After the two groups separated from each other, the rebellious Lamanites were cursed and "cut off from the presence of the Lord." They received a "skin of blackness" so they would "not be enticing" to the Nephites.

The Book of Mormon describes the animosity that the Lamanites held:
	
Believing that they were driven out of the land of Jerusalem because of the iniquities of their fathers, and that they were wronged in the wilderness by their brethren, and they were also wronged while crossing the sea; and again, that they were wronged while in the land of their first inheritance, after they had crossed the sea. (Mosiah 10:12–13)
 
The Book of Mormon also recounts that the Lamanites felt that they were wronged specifically by Nephi and so swore vengeance against his descendants:
 
[the Lamanites] were wroth with him [Nephi] because he departed into the wilderness as the Lord had commanded him, and took the records which were engraven on the plates of brass, for they said that he robbed them.
	
And thus they have taught their children that they should hate them, and that they should murder them, and that they should rob and plunder them, and do all they could to destroy them; therefore they have an eternal hatred towards the children of Nephi. (Mosiah 10:16–17)

After the two groups warred for centuries, the narrative states that Jesus Christ appeared to the more righteous Nephites and the Lamanites, who, by then, had converted in large numbers to righteousness before God. Soon after his visit, the Lamanites and Nephites merged into one nation and co-existed for two centuries in peace. The Book of Mormon further recounts, "There were no robbers, nor murderers, neither were there Lamanites, nor any manner of -ites; but they were in one, the children of Christ, and heirs to the kingdom of God."

However, 84 years after the coming of Christ, "a small part of the people who had revolted from the church" started calling themselves Lamanites again. Those who remained were again identified as Nephites, but both groups were reported to have fallen into apostasy. The Book of Mormon recounts a series of large battles over two centuries, ending with the extermination of the Nephites by the Lamanites.

Doctrine and Covenants
The Doctrine and Covenants is composed of writings that adherents in the Latter Day Saint movement believe to be revelations from God. It is considered scripture in the sacred text of the Latter Day Saint movement and says that God called Oliver Cowdery (D&C 28:8) and later Peter Whitmer and Parley P. Pratt (D&C 32:1–2) to teach the gospel to the Lamanites. Cowdery is given the power to build up God's church among them (D&C 30:6). The men believed that God was referring to the Native Americans and began teaching among the Lenape.

The Doctrine and Covenants also contains a prophecy that the Lamanites will "blossom as a rose" (D&C 49:24) and that the city of Zion would be built on the borders by the Lamanites (D&C 28:9), which was later identified as Missouri (D&C 54:8).

Proposed modern descendants

Historically, Mormons have identified the Lamanites as the primary ancestors of the North American Native Americans. Some publications of the largest denomination in the Latter Day Saint movement, The Church of Jesus Christ of Latter-day Saints (LDS Church) have accepted that position.

Early Mormons expected large numbers of Native American converts to flock to Zion.  After this did not happen, the concept began to expand to include all indigenous peoples of the Americas. After a disproportionate number of Polynesian people converted, the concept expanded to include them as well. The scriptural account of Hagoth was used to justify the connection.  Today, many Latter Day Saint consider Polynesian peoples and the other indigenous peoples of the Americas to be Lamanites. A 1971 church magazine article claimed that Lamanites "consist of the Indians of all the Americas as well as the islanders of the Pacific."

However, the church has stated, "Nothing in the Book of Mormon precludes migration into the Americas by peoples of Asiatic origin." The non-canonical introduction to the 1981 LDS Church edition of the Book of Mormon states that "the Lamanites are the principal ancestors of the American Indians." The wording was changed in the 2006 Doubleday edition and the subsequent editions published by the LDS Church, to state only that the Lamanites "are among the ancestors of the American Indians."

The existence of a Lamanite nation has received no support in mainstream science or archaeology. Genetic studies indicate that the indigenous Americans are related to the present populations in Mongolia, Siberia, and the vicinity, and Polynesians to those in Southeast Asia.

Some Mormon scholars now view Lamanites as either one small tribe among many in the ancient Americas, the remainder of which are not discussed in the Book of Mormon; a tribe that intermarried with indigenous Native Americans; or a tribe that descended with modern Asians from common nomadic ancestry but diverged before Lehi's departure from Jerusalem.

Impact on views on race

In the Book of Mormon, Lamanites are described as having received a "skin of blackness" to distinguish them from the Nephites. The "change" in skin color is often mentioned in conjunction with God's curse on the descendants of Laman for their wickedness and corruption: "And he had caused the cursing to come upon [the Lamanites], yea, even a sore cursing, because of their iniquity. For behold, they had hardened their hearts against him, and they had become like unto a flint; wherefore, as they were white, and exceedingly fair and delightsome, that they might not be enticing unto my people the Lord God did cause a skin of blackness to come upon them" (2 Nephi 5:21).

On the other hand, the Book of Mormon teaches that skin color is not a bar to salvation and that God "denieth none that come unto him, black and white, bond and free, male and female; and he remembereth the heathen; and all are alike unto God, both Jew and Gentile." Elsewhere, the book condemns prejudice against people of dark skin: "O my brethren, I fear that unless ye shall repent of your sins that their skins will be whiter than yours, when ye shall be brought with them before the throne of God. Wherefore, a commandment I give unto you, which is the word of God, that ye revile no more against them because of the darkness of their skins; neither shall ye revile against them because of their filthiness."

The non-canonical 1981 footnote text of the Book of Mormon closely linked the concept of "skin of blackness" with that of "scales of darkness falling from their eyes," which suggests that the LDS Church has now interpreted both cases as being examples of figurative language.

Several Book of Mormon passages have been interpreted by some Latter Day Saints as indicating that Lamanites would revert to a lighter skin tone upon accepting the gospel. For example, at a 1960 LDS Church General Conference, apostle Spencer W. Kimball suggested that the skin of Latter-day Saint Native American was gradually turning lighter:

That view was buoyed by passages such as 2 Nephi 30:6, which in early editions of the Book of Mormon, read: "[T]heir scales of darkness shall begin to fall from their eyes; and many generations shall not pass away among them, save they shall be a white and a delightsome people."

In 1840, with the third edition of the Book of Mormon, the founder of the Latter Day Saint movement, Joseph Smith, whose adherents believe translated the writings of ancient prophets to become the Book of Mormon, changed the wording to "a pure and a delightsome people," consistent with contemporary interpretation of the term "white" as used in scripture. However, all future LDS Church printings of the Book of Mormon until 1981 continued from the second edition, saying the Lamanites would become "a white and delightsome people."

Eventually in the Book of Mormon narrative, the labels "Nephite" and "Lamanite" became terms of political convenience, and membership was both varied and fluid and not based on skin color. Within the first 200 years of the Nephites' 1,000 year chronology, the prophet Jacob stated that any who were enemies of his people were called Lamanites and that any who were friends were called Nephites: "But I, Jacob, shall not hereafter distinguish them by these names, but I shall call them Lamanites that seek to destroy the people of Nephi, and those who are friendly to Nephi I shall call Nephites, or the people of Nephi, according to the reigns of the kings."

Book of Mormon chapter summaries
In December 2010, the LDS Church made changes to the non-canonical chapter summaries and to some of the footnotes in its online version of the Book of Mormon. In Second Nephi 5, the original wording was the following: "Because of their unbelief, the Lamanites are cursed, receive a skin of blackness, and become a scourge unto the Nephites." The phrase "skin of blackness" and the passage was changed to "Because of their unbelief, the Lamanites are cut off from the presence of the Lord, are cursed, and become a scourge unto the Nephites." The second change appears in the summary of Mormon 5. Formerly, it included the phrase that "the Lamanites shall be a dark, filthy, and loathsome people." The new version deleted the phrase "dark, loathsome, and filthy" and now reads "the Lamanites will be scattered, and the Spirit will cease to strive with them."

The changes are seen by some critics to be another step in the evolution of the text of the Book of Mormon to delete racist language from it. Others, such as Marvin Perkins, see the changes as better conforming the chapter headers and footnotes to the meaning of the text in light of the LDS Church's 1978 Revelation on Priesthood. In an interview, a former Brigham Young University graduate student suggested that the changes were made for "clarity, a change in emphasis and to stick closer to the scriptural language".

See also 

House of Joseph (LDS Church)
Gathering (LDS Church)
Historical authenticity of the Book of Mormon
Native American people and Mormonism
Mormonism and Pacific Islanders
Mound Builders#Alternative explanations
People of Ammon
Samuel the Lamanite
Zelph

References

Sources

External links
 Gordon C. Thomasson, "Lamanites", Neal A. Maxwell Institute for Religious Scholarship, byu.org
 Sidney B. Sperry, "An Answer to Budvarson's Criticisms of the Book of Mormon", Chapter XXIV (addressing the converted Lamanites' skin turning white), shields-research.org
 Foundation for Apologetic Information and Research (FAIR), "Topical Guide: DNA and the Book of Mormon", fairlds.org
 Michael R. Ash, "Who Are the Lamanites", fairlds.org
 "A White Pure and Delightsome People", Salt Lake City Messenger, Oct. 1981, utlm.org
 LDS General Authorities on Native Americans from Mormonthink.com

Book of Mormon peoples
Book of Mormon words and phrases
Mormonism and Native Americans
Mormonism and race
Historical definitions of race